Palaces of Korea refers to the architectural style of palaces built during the reign of kingdoms and dynasties in ancient Korea. Although the palaces of Korea were constructed following ancient Chinese principles, Korea has maintained an independent culture for 2000 years, thus resulting in various differences. Korean people still preserved the original elements of their architecture that show no similarities to China or Japan.

The kingdoms in Korean history built capital cities and palaces starting from 1 BC, but many of their exact forms remain unknown. The palaces of Gojoseon (2333–250 BC) cannot be traced at all. The palaces of the Three Kingdoms can be imagined, mainly from some historical records and sites. The palace of Goguryeo was Anhak Palace, constructed after the capital moved to Pyeongyang, causing a need for a new palace. Thus, in 427 AD, Anhak palace was built. Baekje maintained palaces in Sabi (modern-day Buyeo) and Gongju. Silla had its palace, known as the Banwolseong, within Gyeongju. The Palace of Balhae was said to be Sanggyeong Palace, and was one of the largest palaces in Korean history.

The earliest evidence that shows the concrete Korean architectural style can be explored from the architecture of Gaegyeong, the capital of Goryeo Dynasty. Another palace of Goryeo was Manwoldae.

During the Joseon dynasty, there were eight palaces built, of which Gyeongbokgung, Changdeokgung, Changgyeonggung, Deoksugung, and Gyeonghuigung remain.

See also

 Korean architecture
 History of Korea
 Asian architecture
 Korean fortress
 Korean pagoda

References

Architecture in Korea